{{Infobox martial artist
| name            = Manabu Yamada
| other_names     = "Oyabun" ("Kingpin")
| image           = 
| image_size      = 
| alt             =
| caption         = 
| birth_name      =
| birth_date      = 
| birth_place     = Tochigi, Japan
| death_date      =
| death_place     =
| death_cause     =
| residence       =
| nationality     =  Japanese
| height          = 
| weight_lb       = 225
| weight_class    = 
| reach_in        =
| style           = Shootfighting, Brazilian Jiu-Jitsu, Karate 
| stance          =
| fighting_out_of =
| team            =
| trainer         = Satoru Sayama
| rank            =  Black Belt in Karate
| years_active    = 1990 - 2000 (MMA)
| mma_kowin       = 3
| mma_subwin      = 19
| mma_decwin      = 1
| mma_koloss      = 5
| mma_subloss     = 8
| mma_decloss     = 3
| mma_draw        = 6
| mma_nc          = 
| url             =
| sherdog         = 742
| footnotes       =
| updated         =
}}
Manabu Yamada (山田学, born May 18, 1969 in Tochigi, Japan) is a retired Japanese mixed martial arts fighter. He is best known for his participation in Shooto and Pancrase fighting organizations. On December 17, 1994 Yamada advanced to the finals of the King of Pancrase Tournament where he lost to Ken Shamrock via unanimous decision.

Career
Yamada started training with Satoru Sayama at the Super Tiger Gym after a background in karate, debuting in Shooto in 1990. He faced Kenji Kawaguchi twice in matches for the Shooto Middleweight Championship, but he was submitted in both occasions. After two important wins over Kazuhiro Kusayanagi and Naoki Sakurada, he left Shooto and joined Pancrase in 1993.

Manabu had his Pancrase debut against Katsuomi Inagaki, winning rapidly by submission. Shortly after, he got his first big win over Andre Van Den Oetelaar, a kickboxer and Dutch judo champion who sported a large weight advantage. Yamada lost points early due to a rear naked choke and a liver shot, but he came back knocking down Oetelaar with a high kick and then cutting him with a strike, winning the fight by doctor stoppage. Afterwards, Yamada suffered his first defeat in the promotion when he was caught in a heel hook by Takaku Fuke, despite having the points advantage for most of the match.

In December 1994, Yamada took part in the tournament for the first King of Pancrase championship. He eliminated Christopher DeWeaver in two minutes, moving forward to face rising star Frank Shamrock. Despite his opponent's superior strength and late comeback, Yamada caught him in an ankle hold early in the match and resisted all his submission attempts, which gave him the victory by points at the end.

The former Shooto fighter advanced to engage his biggest challenge to the point, the Pancrase co-founder and heavy favourite Minoru Suzuki. In the beginning of a classic fight, Yamada was taken down and had his back fastly taken, but his defensive acumen allowed him to avoid being submitted, and he stole a point from Suzuki with a scrambling rear naked choke. Minoru came back strong, getting several near-holds, but Manabu kept defending and seeking for openings, which granted him another point by ankle hold. He then overpowered Suzuki and controlled him until locked an armbar from side control, making Suzuki tap out for one of his biggest career wins.

The same night, Yamada came again to fight Ken Shamrock in the finals, giving another impressive exhibition by going to the distance with the much stronger Shamrock after 30:00. Yamada again resisted his opponent's grip while turtled up, threatening him with Kimura locks and rolling leglocks from the position, and he even threw a pro wrestling dropkick at the end of the bout, but he lost by decision at the end, with Shamrock being declared King of Pancrase.

Yamada's next match saw an upset when he was submitted by Bas Rutten. Despite his top control, Yamada was trapped in an arm triangle choke and was rendered unconscious due to his refusal to tap out. Manabu lost a match against Jason DeLucia by accidental eye gouge, but he got his course back defeating Pancrase founder Masakatsu Funaki and DeLucia in a revenge match. However, it would be short-lived, as Yamada dropped from main competition, losing to submission to DeLucia in only 1:13 and just getting an important win over Kiuma Kunioku.

Yamada retired in January 2000, after losing to Yuki Kondo, and currently works as MMA trainer and seitai teacher.

Championships and accomplishments
Pancrase Hybrid Wrestling
1994 King of Pancrase Tournament Runner UpTokyo Sports''
Rookie of the Year (1994)

Mixed martial arts record

|-
| Loss
| align=center| 23-16-6
| Yuki Kondo
| Decision (unanimous)
| Pancrase - Trans 1
| 
| align=center| 1
| align=center| 10:00
| Tokyo, Japan
| 
|-
| Draw
| align=center| 23-15-6
| Osami Shibuya
| Draw
| Pancrase - Breakthrough 10
| 
| align=center| 1
| align=center| 30:00
| Osaka, Japan
| 
|-
| Win
| align=center| 23-15-5
| Tae Yoon Han
| Submission (armbar)
| Pancrase - Breakthrough 8
| 
| align=center| 1
| align=center| 0:48
| Sendai, Japan
| 
|-
| Loss
| align=center| 22-15-5
| Jason DeLucia
| Decision (unanimous)
| Pancrase - 1999 Neo-Blood Tournament Second Round
| 
| align=center| 1
| align=center| 15:00
| Tokyo, Japan
| 
|-
| Win
| align=center| 22-14-5
| Leon Dijk
| Decision (majority)
| Pancrase - Breakthrough 5
| 
| align=center| 1
| align=center| 10:00
| Nagoya, Japan
| 
|-
| Draw
| align=center| 21-14-5
| Ryushi Yanagisawa
| Draw
| Pancrase - Breakthrough 3
| 
| align=center| 1
| align=center| 15:00
| Tokyo, Japan
| 
|-
| Win
| align=center| 21-14-4
| David Moore
| Technical Submission (guillotine choke)
| Pancrase - Breakthrough 1
| 
| align=center| 1
| align=center| 0:20
| Tokyo, Japan
| 
|-
| Loss
| align=center| 20-14-4
| Jason DeLucia
| Submission (armbar)
| Pancrase - Advance 12
| 
| align=center| 1
| align=center| 1:13
| Urayasu, Japan
| 
|-
| Win
| align=center| 20-13-4
| Daisuke Watanabe
| Submission (rear-naked choke)
| Pancrase - Advance 10
| 
| align=center| 1
| align=center| 7:33
| Tokyo, Japan
| 
|-
| Draw
| align=center| 19-13-4
| Katsuomi Inagaki
| Draw
| Pancrase - 1998 Anniversary Show
| 
| align=center| 2
| align=center| 3:00
| Tokyo, Japan
| 
|-
| Loss
| align=center| 19-13-3
| Bas Rutten
| Submission (ankle lock)
| Pancrase - Truth 7
| 
| align=center| 1
| align=center| 0:54
| Nagoya, Japan
| 
|-
| Win
| align=center| 19-12-3
| Kiuma Kunioku
| Submission (guillotine choke)
| Pancrase - 1996 Anniversary Show
| 
| align=center| 1
| align=center| 8:29
| Urayasu, Japan
| 
|-
| Loss
| align=center| 18-12-3
| Frank Shamrock
| Submission (rear-naked choke)
| Pancrase - 1996 Neo-Blood Tournament, Round 1
| 
| align=center| 1
| align=center| 12:44
| Tokyo, Japan
| 
|-
| Draw
| align=center| 18-11-3
| Kazuo Takahashi
| Draw
| Pancrase - Truth 6
| 
| align=center| 1
| align=center| 10:00
| Fukuoka, Japan
| 
|-
| Loss
| align=center| 18-11-2
| Semmy Schilt
| Submission (rear-naked choke)
| Pancrase - Truth 5
| 
| align=center| 1
| align=center| 5:44
| Tokyo, Japan
| 
|-
| Loss
| align=center| 18-10-2
| Guy Mezger
| TKO (doctor stoppage)
| Pancrase - Truth 3
| 
| align=center| 1
| align=center| 6:14
| Tokyo, Japan
| 
|-
| Win
| align=center| 18-9-2
| Leon Dijk
| Submission (ankle lock)
| Pancrase - Truth 3
| 
| align=center| 1
| align=center| 2:53
| Tokyo, Japan
| 
|-
| Loss
| align=center| 17-9-2
| Maurice Smith
| KO (punch)
| Pancrase: 1995 Anniversary Show
| 
| align=center| 2
| align=center| 1:46
| Tokyo, Japan
|
|-
| Win
| align=center| 17-8-2
| Vernon White
| Submission (heel hook)
| Pancrase - Eyes Of Beast 5
| 
| align=center| 1
| align=center| 10:26
| Sapporo, Japan
| 
|-
| Win
| align=center| 16-8-2
| Jason DeLucia
| Submission (heel hook)
| Pancrase - Eyes Of Beast 4
| 
| align=center| 1
| align=center| 3:03
| Urayasu, Japan
| 
|-
| Win
| align=center| 15-8-2
| Masakatsu Funaki
| Submission (heel hook)
| Pancrase - Eyes Of Beast 3
| 
| align=center| 1
| align=center| 4:43
| Nagoya, Aichi, Japan
| 
|-
| Loss
| align=center| 14-8-2
| Jason DeLucia
| TKO (doctor stoppage)
| Pancrase - Eyes Of Beast 2
| 
| align=center| 1
| align=center| 1:41
| Yokohama, Japan
| 
|-
| Loss
| align=center| 14-7-2
| Bas Rutten
| Technical Submission (arm-triangle choke)
| Pancrase - Eyes Of Beast 1
| 
| align=center| 1
| align=center| 1:05
| Nagoya, Japan
| 
|-
| Loss
| align=center| 14-6-2
| Ken Shamrock
| Decision (unanimous)
| Pancrase: King of Pancrase Tournament Second Round
| 
| align=center| 1
| align=center| 30:00
| Tokyo, Japan
| Shamrock defeated Yamada to become the inaugural Pancrase Openweight Champion.
|-
| Win
| align=center| 14-5-2
| Minoru Suzuki
| Submission (armbar)
| Pancrase: King of Pancrase Tournament Second Round
| 
| align=center| 1
| align=center| 14:46
| Tokyo, Japan
| 
|-
| Win
| align=center| 13-5-2
| Frank Shamrock
| Submission (ankle lock)
| Pancrase: King of Pancrase Tournament Opening Round
| 
| align=center| 1
| align=center| 8:38
| Tokyo, Japan
| 
|-
| Win
| align=center| 12-5-2
| Christopher DeWeaver
| Submission (heel hook)
| Pancrase: King of Pancrase Tournament Opening Round
| 
| align=center| 1
| align=center| 2:44
| Tokyo, Japan
| 
|-
| Win
| align=center| 11-5-2
| Alex Cook
| Submission (armbar)
| Pancrase - Road To The Championship 5
| 
| align=center| 1
| align=center| 2:27
| Tokyo, Japan
| 
|-
| Loss
| align=center| 10-5-2
| Takaku Fuke
| Submission (heel hook)
| Pancrase - Road To The Championship 4
| 
| align=center| 1
| align=center| 13:47
| Osaka, Japan
| 
|-
| Win
| align=center| 10-4-2
| Matt Hume
| Submission (heel hook)
| Pancrase - Road To The Championship 3
| 
| align=center| 1
| align=center| 2:31
| Tokyo, Japan
| 
|-
| Win
| align=center| 9-4-2
| Andre Van Den Oetelaar
| TKO (doctor stoppage)
| Pancrase - Road To The Championship 2
| 
| align=center| 1
| align=center| 4:52
| Amagasaki, Japan
| 
|-
| Win
| align=center| 8-4-2
| Katsuomi Inagaki
| Submission (kneebar)
| Pancrase - Road To The Championship 1
| 
| align=center| 1
| align=center| 2:04
| Tokyo, Japan
| 
|-
| Win
| align=center| 7-4-2
| Chad Stahelski
| Submission (kneebar)
| Shooto - Shooto
| 
| align=center| 1
| align=center| 2:08
| Tokyo, Japan
| 
|-
| Win
| align=center| 6-4-2
| Naoki Sakurada
| Submission (kneebar)
| Shooto - Shooto
| 
| align=center| 5
| align=center| 1:09
| Tokyo, Japan
| 
|-
| Win
| align=center| 5-4-2
| Kazuhiro Kusayanagi
| Submission (armbar)
| Shooto - Shooto
| 
| align=center| 1
| align=center| 1:05
| Tokyo, Japan
| 
|-
| Loss
| align=center| 4-4-2
| Kenji Kawaguchi
| Submission (kneebar)
| Shooto - Shooto
| 
| align=center| 1
| align=center| 0:36
| Tokyo, Japan
| Kawaguchi defeated Yamada to remain the Shooto Middleweight Champion.
|-
| Win
| align=center| 4-3-2
| Satoshi Honma
| Submission (armbar)
| Shooto - Shooto
| 
| align=center| 1
| align=center| N/A
| Tokyo, Japan
| 
|-
| Win
| align=center| 3-3-2
| Yutaka Fuji
| Submission (kneebar)
| Shooto - Shooto
| 
| align=center| 1
| align=center| 1:39
| Tokyo, Japan
| 
|-
| Loss
| align=center| 2-3-2
| Satoshi Honma
| Submission (armbar)
| Shooto - Shooto
| 
| align=center| 4
| align=center| N/A
| Tokyo, Japan
| 
|-
| Loss
| align=center| 2-2-2
| Kenji Kawaguchi
| Submission (kneebar)
| Shooto - Shooto
| 
| align=center| 1
| align=center| 0:58
| Tokyo, Japan
| Kawaguchi defeated Yamada to become the inaugural Shooto Middleweight Champion.
|-
| Loss
| align=center| 2-1-2
| Yasuto Sekishima
| KO (punch)
| Shooto - Shooto
| 
| align=center| 2
| align=center| N/A
| Tokyo, Japan
| 
|-
| Win
| align=center| 2-0-2
| Yoshimasa Ishikawa
| TKO (punches)
| Shooto - Shooto
| 
| align=center| 1
| align=center| 2:07
| Tokyo, Japan
| 
|-
| Win
| align=center| 1-0-2
| Tomonori Ohara
| KO (punch)
| Shooto - Shooto
| 
| align=center| 1
| align=center| N/A
| Tokyo, Japan
| 
|-
| Draw
| align=center| 0-0-2
| Takashi Ishizaki
| Draw
| Shooto - Shooto
| 
| align=center| 3
| align=center| 3:00
| Tokyo, Japan
| 
|-
| Draw
| align=center| 0-0-1
| Takashi Tojo
| Draw
| Shooto - Shooto
| 
| align=center| 3
| align=center| 3:00
| Tokyo, Japan
|

Mixed martial arts exhibition record

|-
| Draw
| align=center| 0-0-2
| Noboru Asahi
| Technical Draw
| Pancrase - Proof 3
| 
| align=center| 1
| align=center| 5:00
| Tokyo, Japan
| 
|-
| Draw
| align=center| 0-0-1
| Sanae Kikuta
| Technical Draw
| DEEP 2001
| 
| align=center| 1
| align=center| 3:00
| Tokyo, Japan
| 
|-

References

External links
Professional MMA record

Japanese male mixed martial artists
Mixed martial artists utilizing shootfighting
Mixed martial artists utilizing shoot wrestling
Mixed martial artists utilizing karate
Mixed martial artists utilizing catch wrestling
Mixed martial artists utilizing judo
Mixed martial artists utilizing pankration
Japanese catch wrestlers
Japanese male judoka
Japanese male karateka
Living people
1969 births